Georg Eberl (11 May 1936 – 1 January 2023) was a German ice hockey player. He competed in the men's tournament at the 1960 Winter Olympics.

References

External links

1936 births
2023 deaths
Ice hockey players at the 1960 Winter Olympics
Olympic ice hockey players of Germany
Olympic ice hockey players of the United Team of Germany
People from Bad Tölz
Sportspeople from Upper Bavaria